Shuba, Schuba or Shubha may refer to:
Given name
Shubha (actress), an Indian actress
Shuba Jay (1976–2014), Malaysian entrepreneur, stage performer and actress
Shubha Phutela (1991–2012), Indian film actress and model
Shubha Poonja, Indian actress and model
Shubha Raul (born 1967), mayor of Mumbai, India
Shubha Tole (born 1967), Indian neuroscientist

Surname
George Shuba (1924–2014), American baseball player 
Mughira ibn Shu'ba, 7th century companion of Muhammad
Trixi Schuba (born 1951), Austrian figure skater